Irk may refer to:

 River Irk, a lake in northwest England
 Kirksville Regional Airport, Kirksville, Missouri, United States
 Inward-rectifier potassium ion channel, a class of protein
 Iraqw language, a Cushitic language spoken in Tanzania
 Irk, the fictional homeworld of main character Zim in the animated TV series Invader Zim
 Islamic Republic of Kamistan, a fictional country in season 8 of the TV series 24
 Irk, Diz, a historical Assyrian hamlet in Hakkari, Turkey
 Institutional Recovery Key

See also
 Irked Magazine